Kolkata Traffic Police has the job of managing the flow of traffic in the city of Kolkata, India (formerly Calcutta). It is the traffic police unit within the Kolkata Police.

2 deputy commissioners, 8 assistant commissioners, inspectors, sergeants, assistant sub-inspectors, constables etc. work in this department to help motorists reach their destination 
safely in minimum time, in a city having roughly 10% roadspace.

Setup
The total city is divided into 25 Traffic Guards. These Traffic Guards implement the policing with regard to traffic in the city. They are:
 Headquarters Traffic Guard
 Howrah Bridge Traffic Guard
 Shyambazar Traffic Guard
 Jorabagan Traffic Guard
 Sealdah Traffic Guard
 South Traffic Guard
 East Traffic Guard
 South East Traffic Guard
 Bhawanipore Traffic Guard
 South West Traffic Guard
 Vidyasagar Setu Traffic Guard
 Ultadanga Traffic Guard
 Beliaghata Traffic Guard
 Tollygunge Traffic Guard
 Park Circus Traffic Guard
 Metiabruz Traffic Guard
 James Long Sarani Traffic Guard
 D H Road Traffic Guard
 Regent Park Traffic Guard
 Jadavpur Traffic Guard
 Garia Traffic Guard
 Kasba Traffic Guard
 Purba Jadavpur Traffic Guard
 Tiljala Traffic Guard
 Taratala Traffic Guard
 Thakurpukur Traffic Guard

The Traffic Control Room functions round the clock to co-ordinate the field work of the fourteen Traffic Guards. The Traffic Control Room is responsible for traffic arrangements for special occasions, as well as, for piloting. 

The Fatal Squad of this unit investigates cases of serious street accidents involving deaths. Road safety programmes are also organized by the Traffic Department. The Traffic Training School imparts training to the traffic police personnel regarding traffic control and regulation and traffic signaling.

External links
Official site
Info in Kolkata Police website

Kolkata Police Force
Transport in Kolkata
Government agencies with year of establishment missing